An apricot kernel is the apricot seed located within the fruit endocarp, which forms a hard shell around the seed called the pyrena (stone or pit). 

The kernel contains amygdalin, a poisonous compound, in concentrations that vary between  cultivars. Together with the related synthetic compound laetrile, amygdalin has been marketed as an alternative cancer treatment. However, studies have found the compounds to be ineffective for treating cancer.

Use 
The kernel is an economically significant byproduct of fruit processing and the extracted oil and resulting press cake have value. Apricot kernel oil gives Disaronno and some other types of amaretto their almond-like flavor.

Potential toxicity 
Apricot kernels can cause potentially fatal cyanide poisoning when consumed. Symptoms include nausea, fever, headaches, insomnia, increased thirst, lethargy, nervousness, various aches and pains in joints and muscles, and a drop in blood pressure.

In 2016, the European Food Safety Authority reported that eating three small bitter apricot kernels or half of a large bitter kernel would exceed safe consumption levels of amygdalin and potentially cause cyanide poisoning. The Food Safety Authority of Ireland advises against eating either bitter or sweet varieties of apricot kernel due to the risk of cyanide poisoning and advises consumption be limited to one to two kernels a day for an adult. They also advise against consuming bitter almond for the same reasons.

In 1993, the New York State Department of Agriculture and Markets tested the cyanide content of two  (8 oz) packages of bitter apricot kernels imported from Pakistan that were being sold in health-food stores as a snack. The results showed that each package, if consumed entirely, contained at least double the minimum lethal dosage of cyanide for an adult human; the product was removed from stores.
There was one reported case in the medical literature of cyanide toxicity from apricot kernels from 1979 to 1998 in the United States, a non-fatal poisoning by purchased apricot kernels.

See also 
 Annin tofu

References

Prunus
Apricots